Train Limit Law of 1912 was law passed in Arizona that made it illegal to operate trains of more than fourteen passenger cars or more than seventy freight cars. This law was passed as a safety measure. The law was found unconstitutional by the Supreme Court in the case of Southern Pacific Company v. Arizona.

1912 in Arizona Territory
Arizona statutes
1912 in American law
1912 in rail transport